An error (from the Latin error, meaning "wandering") is an action that is inaccurate or incorrect, a mistake.

Error or errors may also refer to:

Music
Error (band), an electro-punk-hardcore band from Los Angeles
Error (Error EP), released in 2004
Errors (band), a four-piece post-electro band from Glasgow, Scotland
"Error" (song), by Madeline Juno
Error (VIXX EP), and the title song by the South Korean boy band
Error (The Warning album), by the Mexican rock band
Error (Lee Chan-hyuk album), by South Korean singer
"Error", a song by Deftones from their 2020 album Ohms
"Error", a live video by Susumu Hirasawa
Error (Hong Kong group), a Hong Kong Cantopop boy music group

Other uses
Error (baseball), mistake by a fielder
Error (law)
Error message, output in computers
Error (linguistics), unintended deviation from the rules of a language variety
Errors and residuals in statistics
Error term

See also
Err (disambiguation)
I am Error, a character from Zelda II: The Adventure of Link